Laurelee Kopeck (born July 17, 1969 in Nelson, British Columbia) is a former field hockey defender from Canada, who earned a total number of 163 international caps for the Canadian National Team during her career. Nicknamed "Jumbo", she graduated from the University of Victoria  (sociology/psychology) in 1996. Kopeck also played club hockey in Hamburg, Germany.

International Senior Tournaments
 1989 – Champions Trophy, Frankfurt, West Germany (6th)
 1990 – World Cup, Sydney, Australia (10th)
 1991 – Olympic Qualifier, Auckland, New Zealand (3rd)
 1991 – Pan American Games, Havana, Cuba (2nd)
 1992 – Summer Olympics, Barcelona, Spain (7th)
 1993 – World Cup Qualifier, Philadelphia, United States (3rd)
 1993 – World Student Games, Buffalo, USA
 1994 – World Cup, Dublin, Ireland (10th)
 1995 – Olympic Qualifier, Cape Town, South Africa (7th)
 1997 – World Cup Qualifier, Harare, Zimbabwe (11th)
 1998 – Commonwealth Games, Kuala Lumpur, Malaysia (not ranked)
 1999 – Pan American Games, Winnipeg, Canada (3rd)
 2001 – Pan American Cup, Kingston, Jamaica (3rd)
 2001 – World Cup Qualifier, Amiens/Abbeville, France (10th)

References

External links
 
 Profile on Field Hockey Canada

1969 births
Living people
Canadian female field hockey players
People from Nelson, British Columbia
Field hockey people from British Columbia
Olympic field hockey players of Canada
Field hockey players at the 1992 Summer Olympics
Field hockey players at the 1998 Commonwealth Games
University of Victoria alumni
Pan American Games medalists in field hockey
Pan American Games bronze medalists for Canada
Field hockey players at the 1999 Pan American Games
Medalists at the 1999 Pan American Games
Commonwealth Games competitors for Canada